The 1 euro coin (€1) is a euro coin with a value of one euro. It is made of two alloys: the inner part of cupronickel, the outer part of nickel brass. All coins have a common reverse side and country-specific national sides. The coin has been used since 2002, with the present common side design dating from 2007.

As of July 2019, there were approximately 7.5 billion one-euro coins in circulation, constituting 25.3% of all circulated euro coins by value and 5.6% by quantity.

History
The coin dates from 2002, when euro coins and banknotes were introduced in the twelve-member Eurozone and its related territories. The common side was designed by Luc Luycx, a Belgian artist who won a Europe-wide competition to design the new coins. The design of the one and two euro coins was intended to show the European Union (EU) as a whole with the then 15 countries more closely joined together than on the 10- to 50-cent coins (the 1- to 5-cent coins showed the EU as one, though intending to show its place in the world).

There were then 15 versions of the national sides (eurozone + Monaco, San Marino and the Vatican who could mint their own) and in each case there was a national competition to decide the design, which had to comply with uniform specifications, such as the requirement to include twelve stars (see euro coins). National designs were not allowed to change until the end of 2008, unless a monarch (whose portrait usually appears on the coins) died or abdicated. This happened in Monaco and the Vatican City, resulting in three new designs in circulation (the Vatican had an interim sede vacante design until the new Pope was elected). National designs have seen some changes, as they are now required to include the name of the issuing country: previously neither Finland nor Belgium showed this. , Austria, Germany and Greece are obliged to change their designs due this requirement in the future.

As the EU's membership has since expanded in 2004 and 2007, with further expansions envisaged, the common face of all euro coins of values of 10 cents and above were redesigned in 2007 to show a new map. This map showed Europe, not just the EU, as one continuous landmass; however Cyprus was moved west as the map cut off after the Bosphorus (which was seen as excluding Turkey for political reasons). The 2007 redesign coincided with the first enlargement of the eurozone in that year, with the entry of Slovenia. Hence, the Slovenian design was added to the designs in circulation. Since then designs for Cyprus, Malta, Slovakia, Estonia, Latvia, Lithuania, and Croatia have been added as each of these states joined the eurozone. Andorra began minting its own designs in 2014 after winning the right to do so.

Design

The coins are composed of two alloys. The inner circle is composed of three layers (copper-nickel, nickel, copper-nickel) and the outer ring of nickel brass, giving the coin a two-colour appearance. The coin has a diameter of 23.25 mm, thickness 2.33 mm and a mass of 7.5 grams. The coins' edges consist of alternating segments: three smooth, three finely ribbed. The coins have been used from 2002, though some are dated 1999, which is the year the euro was created as a currency, but not put into general circulation.

Reverse (common) side
The reverse was designed by Luc Luycx and displays a map of Europe, not including Iceland and cutting off, in a semicircle, at the Bosphorus, north through the middle of Ukraine, then Russia and through northern Scandinavia. Cyprus is located further west than it should be and Malta is shown disproportionately large so that it appears on the map. Six fine lines cut across the map except where there is landmass and have a star at each end—reflecting the twelve stars on the flag of Europe. Across the map is the word EURO, and a large number 1 appears to the left hand side of the coin. The designer's initials, LL, appear next to Cyprus.

In 2007, the map was updated to reflect the EU's enlargements in 2005 and 2007. Other than depicting the newly added countries, the new design was much the same. The map was less detailed and showed no national borders. The vertical lines running across the rightmost third of the coin are interrupted in the middle to make way for eastern Europe.

Obverse (national) side
The obverse side of the coin depends on the issuing country. All have to include twelve stars (in most cases a circle around the edge), the engraver's initials and the year of issue. New designs also have to include the name or initials of the issuing country. The side cannot repeat the denomination of the coin unless the issuing country uses an alphabet other than Latin (currently, Greece is the only such country, hence "1 ΕΥΡΩ" is engraved upon its coin. Austria is currently in breach of the revised rules, but has so far not announced plans to remove "1 EURO" from its coin).

Planned designs

Austria, Germany and Greece will at some point need to update their designs to comply with guidelines stating they must include the issuing state's name or initial, and not repeat the denomination of the coin.

In addition, there are several EU states that have not yet adopted the euro, some of them have already agreed upon their coin designs; however, it is not known exactly when they will adopt the currency, and hence these are not yet minted. See enlargement of the Eurozone for expected entry dates of these countries.

Minting
One-euro coins have been produced every year in Belgium, Finland, France, the Netherlands and Spain. In Austria, Germany, Greece, Ireland, Luxembourg, Portugal, San Marino and the Vatican City no €1 coins were minted dated 1999, 2000 and 2001. In Monaco, no €1 coins were minted in 1999, 2000, 2005, 2008 and 2010. Malta did not issue €1 coins in 2009. Slovenia and Slovakia have produced coins every year since their respective entries to the eurozone.

Proof €1 coins are minted by the majority, but not all, of the eurozone states.

One of the most valuable planned issues of a €1 coin was by Vatican City in 2002, which may sell for several hundred euros. However, the French mint marks were mistakenly not placed on some 2007 Monaco coins which are hence worth more than €200 to collectors.

PP means the proof-condition coins.
Numbers means if more than one coin was minted in that year in that condition by the country. In Germany, there are five mint marks, so they mint ten types of coins in every year. In Greece, there were coins in 2002 which were minted in Finland with S mint mark. In the Vatican, there were coins minted with John Paul II's effigy, and with "Sede Vacante" image in 2005.

Error coins
There are several error 1-euro coins: Italian types from 2002 without mintmarks; Portuguese coins, also from 2002 with another type of edging (28 stripes instead of 29) and from 2008 with the first type of the common side, officially used until 2007; and the famous Monegasque coin from 2007 without mint marks.

References

External links

 
 Information about the euro coin issues

Euro coins
Bi-metallic coins
One-base-unit coins
Maps on coins